Maryland elected its members October 4, 1824.

See also 
 1824 and 1825 United States House of Representatives elections
 List of United States representatives from Maryland

1824
Maryland
United States House of Representatives